James Sloan (October 10, 1748September 7, 1831) was a U.S. Representative from New Jersey.

Born in Newton Township in the Province of New Jersey, Sloan engaged in agricultural pursuits. He was assessor of Newton township for several years, and held several other local offices.

Sloan was elected as a Democratic-Republican to the Eighth, Ninth, and Tenth Congresses (March 4, 1803 – March 3, 1809). He was not a candidate for renomination.

Sloan fell seriously ill in 1811, which resulted in some newspapers reporting that he had died. However, Sloan ultimately did recover from his illness.

Sloan died in September 1831 in the town of Southport, New York.

References

Sources

1748 births
1831 deaths
Democratic-Republican Party members of the United States House of Representatives from New Jersey